Jesse Miller is an American science fiction author. His writing career began in 1972, shortly after he left the United States Air Force.

In 1974, he was a finalist for the second ever John W. Campbell Award for Best New Writer, for his story "Pigeon City".

References

External links

Black speculative fiction authors